The Newburyport Silver Company was an American silversmithing company, active from 1904 to 1914 in Keene, New Hampshire. It was founded in 1902 by 7 men in Newburyport, Massachusetts. In 1904 production moved to Keene and by 1908 the firm employed about 40 craftsmen and a dozen salesman. It produced sterling silver products, such as flatware and candlesticks, for New England and national markets, but ceased operation in 1915.

References 
 "Newburyport Silver Company", Historical Society of Cheshire County.
 Keene: Drawn from the Collections of the Historical Society of Cheshire County, Keene, New Hampshire, Alan F. Rumrill, Arcadia Publishing, 1995, page 37.
 Public Documents of Massachusetts: Being the Annual Reports of Various Public Officers and Institutions ..., Volume 2, State Printers, 1904, page 181.
 "Newburyport Silver Company", Certificate Collector.
 Online Encyclopedia of Silver Marks, Hallmarks, and Makers' Marks
 "Newburyport Silver Company", American Sterling Silver Marks.

American silversmiths